Credit line  may refer to:

 Credit limit
 Line of credit